Michael DiSalle Government Center is the fourth tallest building in Toledo located on 1 Government Center. The building is named after Michael DiSalle who was elected Governor of Ohio in 1958.

The Architect of this Building, Minoru Yamasaki, is best known for designing the original World Trade Center in New York City.

See also
List of tallest buildings in Toledo, Ohio
Toledo, Ohio

References

External links
 Ohio Michael DiSalle Government Center, Department of Administrative Services website

Buildings and structures in Toledo, Ohio
Government buildings in Ohio
Government buildings completed in 1982
Skyscrapers in Ohio
Skyscraper office buildings in Ohio

Minoru Yamasaki buildings
1982 establishments in Ohio